Fernand Fau (13 July 1858 - 27 November 1915) was a French illustrator and cartoonist whose work was widely published in popular journals around the turn of the 19th century.

Biography
Fau was born in Poitiers in 1858. 
He produced copious illustrations under the pseudonym "Fanfare".
He made the illustrations for the drama by Ferny "Le Secret du manifestant" at the "shadow show" in the cabaret Le Chat Noir.
He also illustrated the shadow show Une Affaire d'honneur by Jules Jouy at Le Chat Noir.
In 1890 Le Chat Noir put on his Idylle, a revue in one act with music by Charles de Sivry.
His illustrations appeared in the Chat Noir humorous magazine and also in Le Rire.
He illustrated many children's books throughout his career, and was a satirist.
Fau was also versed in Art Nouveau, and exhibited at the Salon des Cent in 1895.

Fernand Fau died in Paris in 1915.

Illustrated works 

Jean Perrot, 34 leçons de choses en images sans paroles à raconter par les petits, deuxième livre d'initiation et d'élocution, F. Nathan
Alfred Carel, Les brasseries à femmes de Paris, Paris : E. Monnier, 1884
Camille Lemonnier, Les Concubins; La Glèbe; Un pèlerinage, Paris, E. Monnier, de Brunhoff, 1886

 

Georges Courteline, La Peur des coups, Paris, G. Charpentier et E. Fasquelle, 1895
Rabelais pour la jeunesse, Gargantua, texte adapté par Marie Butts, Librairie Larousse
Rabelais pour la jeunesse, Pantagruel, texte adapté par Marie Butts, Librairie Larousse

References

Sources

External links

Dictionnaire des illustrateurs, 1800–1914. Sous la direction de Marcus Osterwalder. Éditions Ides et Calendes, 1989, p. 355

1858 births
1919 deaths
French cartoonists
People from Poitiers
Art Nouveau illustrators